Emi Omo Eso is the name ascribed to the moral code of the Eso Ikoyi warrior caste of the Yorubas of West Africa. Its literal translation is I am the child of an Eso.

History
Following the establishment of the cavalry division of the imperial army of Old Oyo in about the 17th century, the dynasties of Eso chieftains that developed out of it in the metropolitan town of Ikoyi became famous over time for a manner of conduct that came to be synonymous with the noble titleholders themselves.

Eventually coming to describe the proper behaviour of both the Esos and their numerous lineal heirs, the code was encapsulated in a series of proverbs that were passed down through the generations of the Eso families, proverbs which served by way of tradition as mnemonic devices.

Proverbs
The proverbs that make up the body of the Emi Omo Eso philosophical credo include the following:

One of two things befits an Eso: The Eso must fight and conquer or the Eso must fight and perish.

An Eso must never be shot in the back, his wounds must always be right in front.

One that wears a coronet must never flee in battle.

Affirmation
Emi Omo Eso also affected the succeeding generations of Eso heirs. Following the disbanding of the cavalry itself in the 19th century, the children and grandchildren of its former members began to use its name as an affirmation in a manner similar to the usage of the Latin dictum infra dignitatem. Seeing as how a classical Eso was both traditionally obligated and widely considered to be noble in both word and deed, stating that you were a descendant of such a personage was seen within this culture as a means of subconsciously causing yourself to live up to his legacy. The phrase therefore could variously symbolize your contempt for anything mean or low, or your scorn for difficulty, danger or - potentially - death itself. By stating that you were a child of an Eso, you were effectively declaring that you knew no fear, or that a particular thing was beneath your dignity.

See also
 Bushido - A similar concept from Japan
 Chivalry - A similar concept from Europe

References

Yoruba culture
Yoruba words and phrases
Poetic forms
African poetry
Warrior code